This is an incomplete list of people who have served as Lord-Lieutenant of City of Limerick.

William Bourke, 8th Baron Bourke of Connell: 1689–1691 (died 1691)
William Monsell, 1st Baron Emly of Tervoe –1894
Windham Thomas Wyndham-Quin, 4th Earl of Dunraven and Mount-Earl 1895–1922

References

Limerick County of City